The Yeshiva College of South Africa (Yeshivat Beit Yitzchak), commonly known as Yeshiva College - and formerly known as Yeshivat Bnei Akiva - is South Africa’s largest religious Jewish Day School.
The school is headed by Mr Rob Long  since 2018; the Rosh Yeshiva is Rabbi Nechemya Taylor as of 2021.

Yeshiva College
Yeshiva College was established in 1953; it is located in the Glenhazel area of Johannesburg, Gauteng, South Africa.
The school has around 500 pupils, between the ages of 3 and 18. It consists of a nursery school (up to age 6), a coeducational primary school (grades 0-6), and separate boys' and girls' high schools (grade 7-12).

The school adopts a Religious Zionist and Modern Orthodox philosophy. Throughout, pupils study a double curriculum, focusing on Torah study as well as secular studies; students ultimately sitting for the National Senior Certificate (see Matriculation in South Africa), where the school achieves competitively. Various sports and cultural activities are offered and encouraged.

History
The yeshiva was co-founded by Rabbi Michel Kossowsky, an Eastern European Talmudic scholar who had settled in South Africa during the Holocaust, and Rabbi Joseph Bronner, an alumnus of the Yeshiva Rabbi Chaim Berlin in Brooklyn, New York, who had settled in South Africa after World War II and was active in the business world. The yeshiva was named for Rabbi Kossowsky's father, Rabbi Yitzchak Kossowsky, who had preceded him and had served as one of the heads of Johannesburg's Beth Din ("religious court".)

The first full-time instructor of Talmud at the yeshiva was Rabbi David Sanders (rabbi), who was brought out from the Telz yeshiva in the United States to teach the young students Talmud in the traditional style of the Lithuanian yeshivas.

Sanders helped to bring Rabbi Avraham Tanzer, also an alumnus of the Telz, to teach at the yeshiva. Eventually Rabbi Tanzer was appointed the Rosh yeshivah ("dean") of the school, a position which he retained until his passing in 2020. . As above, the Rosh Yeshiva as of 2021 is Rabbi Nechemya Taylor.

Throughout Yeshiva College's history, it has continued to grow in numbers and stature. 
Here, Rabbi Tanzer brought out Rabbi Azriel Goldfein  (again, a fellow Telz yeshiva alumnus) to be a co-Rosh yeshiva; Rabbi Goldfein eventually left to establish the Yeshivah Gedolah of Johannesburg. In the 1980s Rabbi Aharon Pfeuffer similarly taught at the school.

The staff today includes Rabbanim from Israeli, American and South African yeshivot, and graduates of several seminaries likewise.
The school retains its close association with the Bnei Akiva youth movement, extending to Mizrachi, and its local Kollel Bet Mordechai.

External links
Yeshiva College website
Interview with Rabbi Tanzer

See also
§Jewish education in South Africa — under History of the Jews in South Africa.
Orthodox yeshivas in South Africa
Kollel Bet Mordechai
Jewish day school
Torah study
Yeshiva
Yeshiva College (disambiguation)

Ashkenazi Jewish culture in South Africa
Lithuanian-Jewish diaspora
Lithuanian South African
Schools in Johannesburg
Jewish schools in South Africa
Modern Orthodox Jewish day schools
Jews and Judaism in Johannesburg
Orthodox yeshivas in South Africa